Margaret Brackenbury Lacey (26 October 1911 – 4 October 1988) was a British character actress and ballet teacher. She appeared in over 30 films between 1957 and 1985, usually playing a sweet old lady or motherly figure in minor roles.

Early life 
Margaret Lacey was born in Chorlton-cum-Hardy, near Manchester. She was baptised there, at the Church of St. Clement, in 1912, where her baptismal record gives her birthday as 26 October 1911, and her parents' names as Algernon Hearne Lacey and Florence Fanny. She was raised in Wales, and attended Miss Hammond's School in Colwyn Bay.

Career 
Margaret Lacey was magician Jasper Maskelyne's assistant in London, as a young woman in the 1930s.

Lacey appeared in over 30 films between 1957 and 1985, mostly playing a sweet old lady or motherly figure in minor roles. Some of her film credits include Bomb in the High Street (1963), Seance on a Wet Afternoon (1964), Island of Terror (1966), and Far from the Madding Crowd (1967), Black Beauty (1971), and Richard's Things (1980). She was a favorite face of film directors Roy Boulting and John Schlesinger, the latter of whom called her his "mascot".

Lacey is perhaps best remembered internationally for her minor role in the  James Bond film Diamonds Are Forever (1971) in which she played Mrs. Whistler, a seemingly innocent Christian school teacher who smuggles diamonds in her bible for the henchmen Mr. Wint and Mr. Kidd. The character is later found murdered and her body recovered out of an Amsterdam canal.

On television, Lacey appeared in Dr Finlay's Casebook, The Saint, Coronation Street, Weavers Green, and Z-Cars in the 1960s. Her last credited appearances were in Magnum, P.I. and The Brothers McGregor in the 1980s. In 1988, Extra Special: Margaret Lacey, a documentary about Lacey, aired on British television.

For some years in the 1950s and 1960s she held regular dancing classes at the former Metropole Hotel in Colwyn Bay. She also organized concerts and choreographed entertainments at the Prince of Wales Theatre. She was a fixture in the Llandudno Victorian Extravaganza, playing Queen Victoria in the festivities.

Personal life 
Lacey lived in retirement in Wern Cottage, Rowen, Conwy. "Margaret Lacey was a rather eccentric lady," recalled one of her students in a local history. "Her outfits were colorful, and the layers did not always match. Her hair was worn in a rather dishevelled bun, but her bearing was always ladylike." She died in 1988, aged 76, in Llandudno.

Selected filmography

 Brothers in Law (1957) - Helper
 Happy Is the Bride (1958) - Miss Dacres 
 Carlton-Browne of the F.O. (1959) - Onlooker
 I'm All Right Jack (1959) - Empire Loyalist
 A French Mistress (1960) - Kitchen Maid
 Suspect (1960) - Prince's Secretary 
 Dentist on the Job (1961) - Old Lady Contestant
 Bomb in the High Street (1961) - Woman at barrier
 Only Two Can Play (1962) - 1st Pianist (uncredited)
 Heavens Above! (1963) - Molly (uncredited)
 Billy Liar (1963) - Mrs. Matthieson (uncredited)
 Ladies Who Do (1963) - 3rd Charlady (uncredited)
 Séance on a Wet Afternoon (1964) - Woman at first Seance
 Rotten to the Core (1965) - Miss Rossiter
 Sky West and Crooked (1965) - Village Woman
 The Deadly Affair (1966) - Mrs. Bird (uncredited) 
 Island of Terror (1966) - Old Woman
 The Family Way (1966) - Mrs. Harris
 Far from the Madding Crowd (1967) - Maryann Money
 There's a Girl in My Soup (1970) - Autograph Hunter
 Black Beauty (1971) - Anna Sewell
 Mr. Forbush and the Penguins (1971) - Auntie 
 Diamonds Are Forever (1971) - Mrs. Whistler
 The Ruling Class (1972) - Midwife (uncredited)
 Bless This House (1972) - Vicar's Wife
 Smokey Joe's Revenge (1974) - Mrs. Williams
   Robin’s Nest (1976) - Old lady 
 Yanks (1979) - Woman at Hotel
 Richard's Things (1980) - Miss Beale
 Secret Places (1984) - Mrs. Burgess

References

External links 
 
 

1911 births
1988 deaths
People from Llandudno
People from Chorlton-cum-Hardy
British film actresses
20th-century British actresses